The discography of the American electronic musician BT consists of 13 studio albums, 4 compilation albums, 5 extended plays, 39 singles, 28 music videos, and 16 soundtracks.

Albums

Studio albums

Compilation albums

Remix albums

Extended plays

Singles

As lead artist

As featured artist

Promotional singles

Soundtracks

Films

Television

Video games

Songs appearances

Films
{| class="wikitable sortable" width=70%
|-
!width="30"|Year
!width="175"|Title
!width="150"|Songs
!width="150"|Notes
|-
| 1995
| Hackers 
| "Remember""Godspeed (BT Edit)" 
| Included not in the film, but in the soundtrack, particularly in the albums Hackers 2: Music from and Inspired by the Original Motion Picture 'Hackers''' and Hackers 3|-
| 1996
| Twister| "Talula (The Tornado Mix)"
| A remix by BT
|-
| rowspan="2"| 1997
| Mortal Kombat: Annihilation 
| "Anomaly – Calling Your Name" 
| Under the pseudonym Libra Presents Taylor|-
| The Jackal 
| "Shineaway" 
| with Richard Butler
|-
| 1998
| Permanent Midnight| "Godspeed"
| 
|-
| 1999
| American Pie 
| "Anomaly – Calling Your Name"
| 
|-
| rowspan="4"| 2000
| The Art of Dying| "Solar Plexus"
| 
|-
| Gone in 60 Seconds 
| rowspan="2"| "Never Gonna Come Back Down"
| 
|-
| Bounce| 
|-
| Miss Congeniality| "She's a Lady"
| 
|-
| rowspan="8"| 2001
| Driven| "Satellite"
| 
|-
| Double Take 
| "Movement in Still Life"
| 
|-
| Lara Croft: Tomb Raider| "The Revolution"
| 
|-
| The Fast and the Furious| "Nocturnal Transmission"
| 
|-
| 3000 Miles to Graceland| "Smartbomb"
| 
|-
| Zoolander| "Madskillz-Mic Chekka (Remix)"
| Uncredited
|-
| Sweet November| "Shame (Ben Grosse Remix)"
| 
|-
| Valentine| "Smartbomb (BT Mix)"
|  
|-
| rowspan="7"| 2002
| Highway| "Madskillz-Mic Chekka"
|  
|-
| Half Past Dead 
| "Smartbomb"
|  
|-
| Blade II| "Tao of the Machine" 
| with The Roots
|-
| Ballistic: Ecks vs. Sever| "Smartbomb (Plump DJs Remix)"
|  
|-
| The Truth About Charlie 
| "Stealth and Rhythm"
|  
|-
| Extreme Ops| "Revolution"
|  
|-
| Cold Fusion| "Madskillz-Mic Chekka"
|  
|-
| 2003
| The Core| "Sunblind"
|  
|-
| rowspan="2"| 2004
| Raising Helen| "Superfabulous"
|  
|-
| Win a Date with Tad Hamilton! 
| "Superfabulous (Scott Humphrey Radio Mix)"
|  
|-
| rowspan="3"| 2005
| Let the Love Begin| "Somnambulist (Simply Being Loved)"
|  
|-
| Stealth| "She Can (Do That)" 
| with David Bowie
|-
| Domino| "P A R I S"
|  
|-
| 2007
| Battle in Seattle| Additional music
|  
|-
| 2009
| Into the Blue 2: The Reef| "Blue Skies"
|  
|-
| 2010
| The Sorcerer's Apprentice 
| "Le Nocturne de Lumière"
| 
|}

Television

Video games

Collaborations

Remixes

Music videos

This Binary Universe
BT made seven music videos for each of the tracks off of his fifth studio album, This Binary Universe. Most of each of the videos is computer-animated, and each video lasts as long as the studio versions of each song, making them very lengthy. They can all be found on the DVD inside the physical release of This Binary Universe'', and all of the videos were put onto iTunes not long after the release of the album. The track listing is:

"All That Makes Us Human Continues" (8:16)
"Dynamic Symmetry" (11:24)
"The Internal Locus" (10:28)
"1.618" (11:34)
"See You on the Other Side" (14:24)
"The Antikythera Mechanism" (10:06)
"Good Morning Kaia" (8:12)

All songs released in 2006.

(Untitled)
BT made nine music videos for each of the tracks off of his tenth studio album. The videos consist of aerial shots from across the world. The track listing is:

"Tokyo" (6:15)
"The Code of Hammurabi" (3:38)
"Lustral" (3:52)
"Found in Translation" (3:50)
"Artifacture" (19:00)
"Indivisim" (12:11)
"Ω" (15:24)
"Chromatophore" (16:38)
"Five Hundred and Eighty Two" (13:57)

All songs released in 2016.

References

External links

[]

Discographies of American artists
Electronic music discographies